Killeagh GAA club is a hurling and Gaelic football club located in the small village of Killeagh in east County Cork, Ireland. The club is affiliated with the East Cork division of Imokilly and the Cork county board.

It is the sister club of Glenbower Rovers GAA and St.Ita's GAA.

History
Hurling and Gaelic football was played in the parish of Killeagh before the foundation of the GAA in 1884. The first game that Jamesy Kelleher of Dungourney played was in 1892 in Dangan field in the parish of Killeagh. At that time Killeagh did not have a team of their own, so those who did hurl played with the Dungourney team of the early years of the 20th century.

In the early years of the 20th century, football was more popular than hurling, and the club affiliated to the newly formed East Cork board in 1925. In 1957, Killeagh contested the East Cork Junior A hurling title for the first time but lost to a St. Catherines combination. Ten years later, in 1967, the club won the East Cork final by defeating rivals Castlemartyr after a replay. Further hurling titles followed in 1970 and 1971.

Killeagh won its first county title in 1981 by defeating Bandon in the final at Caherlag. Killeagh won the Jamesy Kelleher Cup in 1988 and, after enduring final defeats in 1993 and 1994, won the title again in 1995 - the year when the county was also won by defeating Ballinhassig in the final. They won the All Ireland Junior 7's title in 1996.

In 1999, Killeagh clubman Mark Landers captained Cork to win the Liam MacCarthy Cup and had as his team mates Joe Deane and subkeeper Bernard Rochford.

Killeagh were crowned Cork Intermediate Hurling Championship winners when defeating Mallow in a replayed final at Páirc Uí Chaoimh in 2001.

Camogie

Killeagh camogie club won the All-Ireland Senior Club Camogie Championship in 1980. They won further Munster club championships, five in all, in 1981, 1982, 1984 and 1988 and five Cork senior titles. The club was formed in 1973 by Tony O’Neill, Sheila Spillane and Eamonn Lenihan. They won Féile na nGael Division 1 in 1977
Mary O'Connor is Ireland’s most decorated GAA player. The dual star, from Killeagh, won 12 All-Ireland finals. In football she holds five senior All-Ireland titles, seven Munster championships, four National Leagues, three senior All-Ireland club medals and one at intermediate, seven Munster clubs and 13 county titles. In camogie she holds seven senior All-Ireland medals, 10 Munsters, nine National Leagues, two All-Ireland club medals and four Munster clubs.

Notable players
The inter-county hurling player Joe Deane, who played for Cork as a left full forward, was born in Killeagh.
Mark Landers, who captained Cork to an All Ireland title in 1999, was also part of the Killeagh team that won the County Intermediate title in 2001.

Others include Bernard Rocheford, Michael Byrne and Eoghan Keniry.

Honours
 Cork Intermediate Hurling Championship (1): 2001 (Runners-Up 1998)
 Cork Junior Hurling Championship (1): 1995
 East Cork Junior A Hurling Championship (5): 1967, 1970, 1971, 1988, 1995
 Cork Under-21 Hurling Championship(0): (Runners-Up 2017) (with St. Ita's)
 Cork Under-21 B Hurling Championship (1): 2014 (with St. Ita's)
 Cork Premier 2 Minor Hurling Championship (1): 2022
 Cork Minor A Hurling Championship (1): 2006 (with St. Ita's)
 Cork Minor B Football Championship (2): 1989, 2001
 Féile na nGael Division 6 (1): 2019 (with St.Ita's)

References

Gaelic games clubs in County Cork
Hurling clubs in County Cork